Adhesive weight is the weight on the driving wheels of a locomotive, which determines the frictional grip between wheels and rail, and hence the drawbar pull which a locomotive can exert.

See also
Factor of adhesion
Tractive effort

References

Locomotives